A burr mill, or burr grinder, is a mill used to grind hard, small food products between two revolving abrasive surfaces separated by a distance usually set by the user. When the two surfaces are set far apart, the resulting ground material is coarser, and when the two surfaces are set closer together, the resulting ground material is finer and smaller. Often, the device includes a revolving screw that pushes the food through. It may be powered electrically or manually.

Burr mills do not heat the ground product by friction as much as blade grinders ("choppers"), and produce particles of a uniform size determined by the separation between the grinding surfaces.

Food burr mills are usually manufactured for a single purpose: coffee beans, dried peppercorns, coarse salt, spices, or poppy seeds, for example. Coffee mills for volume consumption are usually powered by electric motors, but fast and precise manual mills have experienced an uptick in popularity in the 2020s for individual-serving pour-over and espresso. Domestic pepper, salt, and spice mills, used to sprinkle a little seasoning on food, are usually operated manually, sometimes by a battery-powered motor.

Coffee grinders

The uniform particle size and variable settings of a burr grinder make it well-suited for coffee preparation, as different methods of coffee preparation require different size grinds. The size of the grind is determined by the width between the two burrs, into which the coffee beans fall and are ground a few at a time.  A finer grind allows a larger surface area to come into contact with the water, which yields a more complete extraction of caffeine and flavor. The grind spectrum ranges from Turkish coffee and espresso on the finer end to a French press and cold brew extraction on the coarse/extra coarse end, with pour-overs and drip coffee in the medium-fine to medium range.

Burr coffee grinders are also more suited for keeping the flavor and aroma of the coffee beans intact, as they produce less heat from friction compared to blade grinders; "The oils and aromas can easily dissipate if the beans become too hot during grinding, although most grinders will not heat the beans to a high enough temperature to risk this occurring."

Burr grinders obtain these lower speeds and even grind through two mechanisms. The lower cost models generally use a small electric motor to drive a series of reduction gears, while better constructed and more costly examples use a larger commercial motor and a belt, with no gear reduction to spin the burrs. The latter example is termed "direct drive". The reduction gear versions are noisier and usually do not have the lifespan of the direct drive units.

Electrical powered burr grinders are available in many variations. Some grinders are "stepped" meaning that they are fixed by the factory into a set series of adjustments while "stepless" varieties use a worm drive or other mechanisms to offer a near-infinite number of adjustments within their grind range. Other variations include grinders that are equipped with dosers and others that are "doserless". Dosers function as a catch bin to collect the ground coffee and by using a lever, users are able to dose a set amount of coffee. Doserless versions remove the bin and dosing function, and the grinder outputs the ground coffee directly into an espresso machine portafilter or into another container. The doserless examples normally feature additional functions such as weight based or advance time based grinding in order for a barista to grind for an exact amount of grounds required for a specific espresso shot.

Manual coffee grinders have been largely supplanted by electrically powered ones for speed.  Manual grinders are used for convenience and aesthetic reasons and are usually less costly than electric models. An example is the manual Turkish coffee grinder; these are inexpensive and can grind coffee to fine powder for Turkish coffee.

Manual grinders
Manual burr grinders are turned by hand, rotating one grinding surface against the other. Coffee mills usually have a handle, providing leverage for the many turns required to grind enough coffee for a cup. The ground coffee is collected in a container which is part of the mill.

Salt, pepper, and spice mills, essentially the same as coffee mills, usually do not have a handle, the entire top rotating instead. While this is less convenient, only a few turns are required to grind enough. The ground product falls directly onto the food being seasoned; the mill has no container. A few designs have abrasive surfaces which do not rotate; each squeeze of the handles moves one flat plate past another, then the plates are restored to their original position by a spring. Many hard spices are available in containers incorporating a simple cone burr grinder, intended to be discarded when empty.

Most grinders can be adjusted to set the fineness of grind.

Manual mills can be used for grinding other food products than they are intended for, but mills designed for pepper grinding are inappropriate for producing finely-ground flour. Laura Ingalls Wilder's novel The Long Winter describes a family grinding wheat in a coffee mill to make flour during months of hardship.

The first coffee grinder was made by Richard Dearmann, an English blacksmith from Birmingham, in 1799. This grinder was widely distributed in the US, where Increase Wilson patented the first wall coffee grinder in 1818.

Peugeot of France patented a pepper grinder in 1842. The mechanism of case-hardened steel cracked the peppercorns before the actual grinding process. The grooves on the Peugeot mechanism were individually cut into the metal and then case-hardened, making them very durable.

Materials 
There are several types of materials used in pepper mills, each with its own particular advantages. Corrosion-resistant materials are used to grind salt.

Stainless steel: One of the most suitable and durable materials for grinding peppercorns and coffee beans. The male and female sections of the grinding mechanism are usually made from sintered metal.  This material is preferred by professional chefs. The teeth of the grinder are machined to cut spice or beans. Stainless steel is not suggested for grinding salt.

Zinc alloy: Perhaps the most common mechanism found in pepper grinders, zinc alloy is composed of a mixture of metals, primarily zinc, often with chrome plating to resist corrosion. It is a good choice for grinding pepper but is not suitable for grinding salt.

Carbon steel: An extremely hard metal, carbon steel provides the sharpest edges and most efficient grinding capability. Carbon steel is not suitable for grinding salt.

Ceramic: Ceramic is extremely hard and provides the best performance for multi-use grinding. It does not corrode and is suitable for grinding coffee beans, pepper, salt, and spices.

Acrylic: Durable and low cost, acrylic is a non-corrosive material suitable for grinding salt and spices.

Electric grinders
Electric burr grinders are powered by electricity from a battery or mains supply. An electric motor drives the grinding elements against each other. Electric grinders grind faster than manual grinders with no effort, but friction and waste heat from the motor may heat the ground product slightly.

See also
 
 Salt and pepper shakers – for salt grains and pre-ground peppercorns

References

Further reading
 

Articles containing video clips
Food grinding tools
Food preparation appliances
Grinding mills